Batocera aeneonigra is a species of beetle in the family Cerambycidae. It was described by Thomson in 1859. It is found in Papua New Guinea, the Moluccas, and East Timor.

Subspecies
 Batocera aeneonigra aeneonigra Thomson, 1859
 Batocera aeneonigra occidentalis Kriesche

References

Batocerini
Beetles described in 1859
Beetles of Oceania